Kanezawa (written: 金沢) is a Japanese surname. Notable people with the surname include:

, founder of the Kanazawa Bunko
, Japanese shogi player

Japanese-language surnames